Task Force Thiele was an organizational unit of the German Kriegsmarine during World War II. It was named after its commander Vizeadmiral August Thiele who led the task force from 23 March 1945 until it was disbanded on 27 April 1945. It was formed from the Second Task Force which had been created on 28 July 1944 from the Baltic Sea Training Unit, also under command of Thiele.

Background

Operational history
Thiele on-board of Prinz Eugen led the task force on 19 August 1944 in support of the German forces in Courland. Prinz Eugen ship fired a total of 265 rounds from its 20.3 cm (8.0 in) SK L/60 guns. In parallel, the destroyers Z25, Z28, Z35 and Z36 and the torpedo boats T23 and T28 attacked further targets.

The Soviet advance in the Baltic continued. The last German convoy left Reval on 23 September. On 29 September Soviet forces landed on Moon, on 2 October on Dagö, and on 5 October on Ösel, where the German troops were cut off on the Sworbe peninsula. Memel was about to fall to the Soviets. Thiele's task force, which included Prinz Eugen, Lützow, four destroyers and four torpedo boats, left Gotenhafen on 10 October to support the defensive land battles. In the timeframe 10–12 and 14–15 October Prinz Eugen bombarded 28 different targets and expended 1,196 20.3 cm rounds.

Order of battle
Major warships assigned to Task Force Thiele included:

Lützow, a  heavy cruiser
Admiral Scheer, a Deutschland-class heavy cruiser
Prinz Eugen, a  heavy cruiser

Taks Force Command
Vizeadmiral August Thiele, 28 July 1944 – 27 April 1945
Vizeadmiral Bernhard Rogge, 10–22 March 1945 (in deputize)

1. Admiralstabsoffizier / Chief of Staff
Korvettenkapitän Kurt Reitsch, August 1944 – 27 April 1945
2. Admiralstabsoffizier
Korvettenkapitän Wolfgang Freiherr von Steinaecker, February 1945 – 27 April 1945
3. Admiralstabsoffizier
Vacant
4. Admiralstabsoffizier
Korvettenkapitän Helmut Michaelis, November 1944 – 27 April 1945
Task Force Engineer
Korvettenkapitän (Ing.) Kurt Ziegler, September 1944 – 27 April 1945
Task Force Court
Geschwaderrichter Dr.jur. Walter Meese, 28 Jul 1944 – January 1945 (tasked with the obligations)
Marineoberstabsrichter Dr.jur. Axel Hawranke, January 1945 – 27 April 1945

References
Citations

Bibliography

 
 
 

Military units and formations of the Kriegsmarine
Military units and formations established in 1944
Military units and formations disestablished in 1945